Krumau is the German name for two towns in the Czech Republic:

Český Krumlov (Krumau an der Moldau / Böhmisch Krumau, Krummau)
Moravský Krumlov (Mährisch Kromau)

Krumau is also the name of two locations in Austria:
Krumau, a township of the municipality of Admont in Lower Austria
the municipality Krumau am Kamp in Lower Austria

See also
Krumlov (disambiguation)